The 1968 New York Giants season was the franchise's 44th season in the National Football League (NFL). For the 1968 season, the Giants traded divisions with the New Orleans Saints, with the Giants moving from the Century Division to the Capitol Division. The Giants finished with a 7–7 record, which placed them second in the Capitol Division, five games behind the Dallas Cowboys.

The Giants did not have a first-round selection in the 1968 NFL/AFL Draft; their first pick was Rich Buzin, taken in the second round with the 41st overall pick. New York began the season with a four-game winning streak. After a four-game stretch in which they had three losses, the Giants went to Dallas and posted an upset victory, 27–21. With that win and a victory against the Philadelphia Eagles the following week, the Giants moved into contention for a Capitol Division championship. However, they lost the final four games of the season. The 1968 regular season was Allie Sherman's last as head coach of the Giants; he was fired after the preseason in 1969.

Roster

Schedule

Standings

References 

1960s in the Bronx
New York Giants
New York Giants
New York Giants seasons